Inulopsis is a genus of South American flowering plants in the family Asteraceae.

 Species
 Inulopsis camporum (Gardner) G.L.Nesom - Brazil, Bolivia
 Inulopsis scaposa (DC.) O.Hoffm. - Brazil, Paraguay
 Inulopsis stenophylla Dusén - Brazil

References

Asteraceae genera
Astereae